Bagh-e Tighun (also Romanized as Bāgh-e Ţīghūn; also known as Bāgh-e Ţīfūn, Bāgh-e Tīghān, Bāgh-e Ţīqūn, Bāgh-e Tūkhan, Bāgh-i-Taighān, Baghţīqūn, and Bakh Tūkhen) is a village in Sar Firuzabad Rural District, Firuzabad District, Kermanshah County, Kermanshah Province, Iran. At the 2006 census, its population was 312, in 73 families.

References 

Populated places in Kermanshah County